In Inuit folklore, the kăk-whăn’-û-ghăt kǐg-û-lu’-nǐk or akh’lut is an orca-like composite animal that takes the form of a wolf when on land, and is sometimes depicted as a wolf-orca hybrid.

Inuit folklore
In 1900, the American naturalist Edward William Nelson described the kăk-whăn’-û-ghăt kǐg-û-lu’-nǐk among a number of other mythical and composite animals:

Nelson attributed stories of the creature to the orca (akh’lut), and explained wolf tracks appearing to lead into the sea as the result of ice breaking away from the edge. He identifies other composite animals among Inuit folklore, including a white whale that can transform into a reindeer, and says that belief in the kăk-whăn’-û-ghăt kǐg-û-lu’-nǐk is prevalent among Inuit along the shore of the Bering Sea. 

More recent collections of myths and folklore have used the term Nelson gives for the orca, akh’lut, to describe the composite animal.

See also
Kelpie
Selkie

References

Wolves in folklore, religion and mythology
Inuit legendary creatures
Sea monsters